David C. Robinson (1833 – 1874), was a steamboat captain on the Colorado River from 1857 to 1873.

A ships carpenter, David C. Robinson, came to the Colorado River in 1850 on the army transport schooner, Invincible commanded by captain Alfred H. Wilcox.  He accompanied Lieutenant George Derby when he attempted to reach Fort Yuma with supplies by boat.  He returned in 1854 serving as mate on the crew of George Alonzo Johnson's steamboat General Jesup.  He commanded Ives steamboat Explorer on Ives' expedition up the Colorado River in 1857.  Ives attributed much of the success of his expedition to Robinson's efforts.

Subsequently, Robinson became captain of George A. Johnson & Company steamboat Cocopah in 1859.  He later ran the boatyard at Port Isabel, Sonora where he maintained the company steamboats and built the Gila, launched in January 1873, (later rebuilt in 1899 as the Cochan).  later in 1873, he quit the Colorado River, moving his family to Northern California, and captained a boat on Clear Lake.  He died of a lung hemorrhage on July 17, 1874, at the age of 41.

References

American shipbuilders
Steamship captains
1833 births
1874 deaths
People in 19th-century California
Steamboat transport on the Colorado River